Friedrich "Fritz" Haffer (born 26 May 1914, date of death unknown) was a Romanian male handball player. He was a member of the Romania men's national handball team. He was a part of the  team at the 1936 Summer Olympics. On club level he played for Hermannstädter Turnverein in Romania.

He is the brother of handball player Karl Haffer who was also part of the national team at the 1936 Summer Olympics.

References

1914 births
Year of death missing
Romanian male handball players
Olympic handball players of Romania
Place of birth missing
Field handball players at the 1936 Summer Olympics